

Events
An Italian-American criminal organization known as the Favara Brotherhood is discovered to be operating in Sulphur County, Sicily.
8 March – Whyos gang member Mike McGloin is hanged at Tombs Prison for the murder of saloonkeeper Louis Hannier.
16 October - Johnny Walsh is killed in a gunfight with rival Dutch Mob gang members Johnny Irving and Billy Porter in Shang Draper's saloon. Irving is also killed in the shootout, while Porter, though he is shot, survives and is arrested.

Arts and literature

Births

Deaths
8 March – Mike McGloin, Whyos member
16 October - Johnny Walsh, Walsh Gang leader
16 October - Johnny Irving, Dutch Mob leader

References

Organized crime
Years in organized crime